Lechenaultia pulvinaris, commonly known as cushion leschenaultia, is a species of flowering plant in the family Goodeniaceae and is endemic to inland areas of south-western Western Australia. It is a low-lying, hemispherical shrub with narrow, rigid, crowded, hairy leaves, and pale blue or purple flowers.

Description

Taxonomy
Lechenaultia pulvinaris was first formally described in 1964 by Charles Gardner in the Journal of the Royal Society of Western Australia from specimens he collected near Corrigin. The specific epithet (pulvinaris) means "resembling a cushion".

Distribution and habitat
Cushion leschenaultia grows in open patches of sand in low scrub between Corrigin and Wagin in the Avon Wheatbelt and Jarrah Forest biogeographic regions of south-western Western Australia.

Conservation status
This leschenaultia is listed as "Priority Four" by the Government of Western Australia Department of Biodiversity, Conservation and Attractions, meaning that it is rare or near threatened.

References

Asterales of Australia
pulvinaris
Eudicots of Western Australia
Plants described in 1964
Taxa named by Charles Gardner